Double Hope Films is a production company founded by independent film producer Ted Hope and his wife Vanessa Hope.

Films
 Starlet (2012)
 Dark Horse (2011)

Film production companies of the United States